Eliphalet Ferris House is a registered historic building in Mariemont, Ohio, listed in the National Register on May 29, 1975.  The house was constructed in 1802 or 1803, or built or expanded in 1812.
It was restored in 1927 by Richard H Dana.  By 1936 it was in use as the  Mariemont Historic Museum, with rooms furnished by the Daughters of the American Revolution.

Historic and current use
 Domestic single dwelling
 Museum

Notes

Houses on the National Register of Historic Places in Ohio
Houses in Hamilton County, Ohio
National Register of Historic Places in Hamilton County, Ohio